Charles de Valois is the name of:

 Charles, Count of Valois (1270–1325)
 Charles, Duke of Orléans (1394–1465), also count of Valois
 Charles de Valois, Duc de Berry (1446–1472), son of Charles VII, King of France and Marie of Anjou
 Charles de Valois, Duc d'Orléans (1522–1545)
 Charles de Valois, Duke of Angoulême (1573–1650), Duke of Angoulême